Bugaba is a corregimiento in Bugaba District, Chiriquí Province, Panama. Its population as of 1990 was 1,989; its population as of 2000 was 2,817.

References

Corregimientos of Chiriquí Province